The Cretan Revolt of 1841 was one of many revolutions of the local Greeks to free themselves from the Ottoman Empire.

It was part of what is known as the Eastern Question and more specifically the Egyptian-Ottoman War of 1839-1841, where Muhammad Ali's forces forced the Ottoman army to retreat at the Battle of Nezib. This made an attack on the Ottoman capital, Istanbul (Constantinople), through Syria possible, which went against the Great Power's interests of maintaining the Ottoman Empire. After the Great Power's intervention on the matter, there was a possibility that Crete would join the newly formed Kingdom of Greece, at first through diplomatic means. However, military intervention by the Kingdom of Greece was also considered, as the crisis had lifted the Greek people's spirits, who wanted to liberate their fellow Greeks, by any means necessary. There were two requests made by the Committee of Exiled Cretans, in late 1838 and 10 August 1839, which requested the island be temporarily occupied by British forces, but both were ignored.

The Greek government would later go on to sign a trade treaty with the Ottoman Empire, hampering the hopes of the Cretans to get assistance from Greece itself. Furthermore, with the Convention of London, signed 15 July 1840, the United Kingdom, France, Russia and Prussia decided to recognise the transfer of the island from Muhammad Ali back to the Ottoman Empire. Knowing that if this convention were to be ratified, hopes of unification with Greece or independence would be crushed, a handful of exiled Cretans, Vasileios Chalis, Ioannis Koumis, Emmanouil Patelaros, Anagnostis Tsouderios, Emmanouil Deiktatis, Aristeidis and Charidimos Chaireti and Aleksandros Koumoundouros, communicated with local guerillas and had all gone to Crete by late 1840. After a short period of preparation, they declared the revolution, on 22 February 1841.

The Turkish governor originally wanted to make peace with the rebels, however he later sent troops to the main areas of rebel concentration and managed to suppress the rebellion. The rebels stood alone, with the foreign powers and Greece having refused to aid them in their effort, and so they lost, having sustained heavy casualties, at the battles of Provarma, Vafe, Ksida and Vryses, with the remaining rebel leaders fleeing for Greece, taking with them other women and children.

References

1841 in the Ottoman Empire
Conflicts in 1841
19th-century rebellions
Greek rebellions against the Ottoman Empire
Cretan rebellions